Hieronyma is a genus in the plant family Phyllanthaceae. It was first described as a genus in 1848. This family was formerly united with spurges, crotons, copperleaves, etc. (Euphorbiaceae), but have turned out to be well distinct. The genus is native to South America, Central America, southern Mexico, and the West Indies. It is dioecious, with male and female flowers on separate plants.

The spelling Hieronyma has been conserved; the spellings Hieronima and Hyeronima are spelling variants of this name.

Hieronyma is used locally as a foodplant, e.g. by the Nukak of Guaviare Department in the Amazon natural region of Colombia. Several species are threatened by deforestation.

Species

References

 
Phyllanthaceae genera
Dioecious plants